Rabon is a surname. Notable people with the surname include:

Bill Rabon (born 1951), American politician
František Raboň (born 1983), Czech cyclist
Mike Rabon (born 1943), American musician
Jacob Rabon IV, better known as Alpharad (born 1995), American YouTuber and eSports personality

See also
Jiu River